The 1984 Minnesota Strikers season of the North American Soccer League  was the first season of the new team, and the club's eighteenth season in professional soccer.  It is also the first ever incarnation of the club's new name.  Previously, they were known as the Fort Lauderdale Strikers.  This was the first time the club played in the Western Division.  They finished in third place and did not make the playoffs that year.  After the league ended in 1984, the club folded the outdoor team and placed an indoor team in the Major Indoor Soccer League during the 1984–85 season, and continued to do so until 1988.

Background

Review

Competitions

NASL regular season 
W = Wins, L = Losses, GF = Goals For, GA = Goals Against, BP = Bonus Points, Pts= point system

6 points for a win,
4 points for a shootout win,
0 points for a loss,
1 point for each regulation goal scored up to three per game.

Scoring leaders
GP = Games Played, G = Goals (worth 2 points), A = Assists (worth 1 point), Pts = Points

Leading Goalkeepers
Note: GP = Games played; Min = Minutes played; GA = Goals against; GAA = Goals against average; W = Wins; L = Losses; SO = Shutouts

Results summaries

Results by round

Match reports

NASL Playoffs 
Did not qualify

Statistics

Transfers

References 

1984
Minnesota Strikers
Minnesota Strikers
Minnesota